Justin Rowsell (born 22 December 1971) is an Australian boxer. He competed in the men's lightweight event at the 1992 Summer Olympics.

References

External links
 

1971 births
Living people
Australian male boxers
Olympic boxers of Australia
Boxers at the 1992 Summer Olympics
Commonwealth Games medallists in boxing
Commonwealth Games silver medallists for Australia
Boxers at the 1990 Commonwealth Games
AIBA World Boxing Championships medalists
Lightweight boxers
Medallists at the 1990 Commonwealth Games